Ezequiel Marcelo Spinella (born 23 October 1999) is an Argentine professional footballer who plays as a defender for Centro Español.

Career
Spinella played for the Quilmes academy, prior to joining the ranks of Temperley; who he made the breakthrough into the first-team for during 2018–19 under manager Gastón Esmerado. He made his professional bow with a six-minute cameo in a Primera División victory away to Belgrano on 12 May 2018; as Temperley were relegated to Primera B Nacional. Another substitute appearance arrived in the succeeding October versus San Lorenzo in the Copa Argentina. He was released at the end of 2019.

Career statistics
.

References

External links

1999 births
Living people
Place of birth missing (living people)
Argentine footballers
Association football defenders
Argentine Primera División players
Club Atlético Temperley footballers
Centro Social y Recreativo Español players